Walter Thomas Gegan (December 1, 1899 – December 30, 1931) was an American middle-distance runner. He competed in the men's 3000 metres steeplechase at the 1928 Summer Olympics.

High schools attended include Seton Hall Prep 1916-1919 and St Benedicts Prep 1919-1920.

Colleges attended include Notre Dame University 1921 and Georgetown University 1922 - 1926.

References

External links
 

1899 births
1931 deaths
Athletes (track and field) at the 1928 Summer Olympics
American male middle-distance runners
American male steeplechase runners
Olympic track and field athletes of the United States
Place of birth missing
20th-century American people